Sampurna Lahiri is a Bengali film and television actress. She made her big screen debut in the 2012 film Goray Gondogol. In the same year she acted in the films Accident and Paanch Adhyay.

Works

Films 

As Producer
Mini

Web series

Television 
 Tare Ami Chokhe Dekhini (Star Jalsha)
 Bigg Boss Bangla"Contestant" (ETV Bangla)
 Byomkesh ( Chiriakhana) (Colors Bangla)
 Robi Thakurer Golpo ( Nauka Dubi) (Colors Bangla) 
Byomkesh (2014 TV series)
Najor as Daayan/Maya (Star Jalsha)
Bangla Medium

References

External links 
 
Official Facebook Page: https://www.facebook.com/iamsampurna

Bengali television actresses
Actresses in Bengali cinema
Living people
21st-century Indian actresses
Indian film actresses
Indian television actresses
Bigg Boss Bangla contestants
Year of birth missing (living people)